Boban is a Croatian family name and Serbian, Montenegrin and Macedonian masculine given name. Among Serbs, Montenegrins and Macedonians, Boban might be used as a nickname form of the name "Slobodan" or "Bogdan". Most Croats named "Boban" are originally from village named Bobanova Draga in the  municipality of Grude, Bosnia and Herzegovina. Boban is a masculine given name in Kerala. Notable people with the name include:

Surname:
 Ana Boban (born 1947), Croatian swimmer who competed for Yugoslavia at 1968 Olympics
 Blaženko Boban (born 1960), Croatian politician
 Bruno Boban (1992-2018), Croatian footballer
 Eugène Boban (1834-1908), French antiquarian who sold the first crystal skulls to museum collections in the late 19th century
 Ervin Boban (born 1965), Croatian footballer
 Gabrijel Boban (born 1989), Croatian footballer
 Gordana Boban (born 1967), actress from Bosnia and Herzegovina
 Kunchacko Boban (born 1976), Indian film actor
 Ljubo Boban (1933-1994), Croatian historian
 Mate Boban (1940-1997), Bosnian-Herzegovian politician
 Rafael Boban (1907-1945?), Croatian Ustaše officer
 Tonči Boban (born 1971), Croatian footballer
 Zvonimir Boban (born 1968), Croatian footballer

Given name:
 Boban Alummoodan, Indian actor
 Boban Apostolov (born 1984), Macedonian musical artist
 Boban Babunski (born 1968), Yugoslav/Macedonian footballer
 Boban Bajković (born 1985), Montenegrin footballer
 Boban Birmančević (born 1969), Serbian politician
 Boban Bogosavljević (born 1988), Serbian chess grandmaster
 Boban Božović (born 1963), Bosnian footballer
 Boban Cenić (born 1991), Serbian footballer
 Boban Đerić (born 1993), Bosnian footballer
 Boban Dmitrović (born 1972), Serbian footballer
 Boban Georgiev (born 1997), Macedonian footballer 
 Boban Grnčarov (born 1982), Macedonian footballer
 Boban Ilić (born 1963), Serbian sculptor
 Boban Jančevski (born 1978), Macedonian footballer
 Boban Janković (1963-2006), Serbian basketball player
 Boban Jović (born 1991), Slovenian footballer
 Boban Kajgo (born 1989), Canadian soccer player of Serbian origin
 Boban Knežević (born 1959), Serbian writer
 Boban Lazić (born 1994), Bosnian footballer
 Boban Maksimović (born 1985), Swiss footballer of Serbian descent
 Boban Marjanović (born 1988), Serbian basketball player
 Boban Marković (born 1964), Serbian trumpet player of Romani background
 Boban Mitev (born 1972), Macedonian basketball coach
 Boban Nikolić (born 1980), Serbian footballer
 Boban Nikolov (born 1994), Macedonian footballer
 Boban Nikolovski (born 1977), Macedonian footballer
 Boban Petrović (1957-2021), Serbian basketball player
 Boban Rajović (born 1971), Montenegrin pop singer
 Boban Ranković (born 1979), Serbian rower
 Boban Samuel, Indian film director
 Boban Savović (born 1979), Montenegrin basketball player
 Boban Stajić (born 1993), Macedonian basketball player
 Boban Stojanović (born 1978), Serbian activist
 Boban Stojanović (footballer) (born 1979), Serbian footballer
 Boban Tomić (born 1988), Slovenian basketball player
 Boban Vasov (born 1986), Serbian footballer
 Boban Zirintusa (born 1992), Ugandan footballer

See also
 Boban (album), an album by Boban Rajović
 Boban, an Indian comic character

Croatian surnames
Slavic masculine given names
Serbian masculine given names
Macedonian masculine given names
Patronymic surnames
Indian names